The following is a list of episodes of the television show What I Like About You. The series aired on The WB from September 20, 2002 to March 24, 2006, with 86 episodes produced spanning 4 seasons.

Series overview

Episodes

Season 1 (2002–03)

Season 2 (2003–04)

Season 3 (2004–05)

Season 4 (2005–06)

References

External links
 
 

What I Like About You
What I Like About You